Kakching (Meitei pronunciation:/kək.ciŋ/) is a town in the southeastern part of the Indian state of Manipur. It serves as the headquarters of Kakching district and is a major commercial hub in the state. In 2018, Kakching was declared as the cleanest city in North East India.

Geography 

Kakching ( . ) is located in the southern part of Imphal valley. It has an average elevation of 776 metres (2545 feet).

The town is about 44 km from the state capital Imphal, and about 70 km from the international border with Burma.

Demographics 
According to the 2011 census, the population of Kakching was 32,138, of which 15,710 were males and 16,428 were females. The population of children aged from zero to six years was 4,181, which was 13.01% of the total population. The female sex ratio was 1,046 against the state average of 985. The literacy rate was 83.08%, against the state average of 76.94%. Male literacy was 90.21% while the female literacy rate was 76.40%.

In terms of population, development and education, Kakching is the biggest town in Kakching district.

Economy 
Traditionally, the main occupation of the people of Kakching has been the farming of crops, but greater opportunities have arisen in the last five years, including carpentry, goldsmithing, sales, construction work, as well as the raising of livestock. Additionally, the state and central governments finance self-help groups (SHGs).

Kakching is known as the Granary of Manipur. Its workers produce the highest percentage of food grains in the state. The availability of proper irrigation and canal facilities has allowed farmers to practice double cropping. Ethei Khong, the main canal in Kakching is one of the longest canals in Manipur. Rice, mustard, pulses, cereal, and potatoes are the important products of this town. In recent years significant improvement has been seen in horticultural products including apples, citrus fruits, and strawberries. Hand-loom and handicraft products are also made in high volume for the Kakching market.

Education 
Kakching has the highest literacy rate in the state of Manipur. Undergraduate programs are offered in Kha Manipur College. Kakching Higher Secondary School, Padma Ratna English School, and JRD Pathseeker Academy are the main school for higher secondary level schooling. There are many high schools, and several middle and primary schools in and around Kakching, including Padma Ratna English School, Martin Grammar School, Victory High School, Kakching Public School, and Grace Cottage Academy.
Other important institutes include the District Institute of Education and Training (DIET), Kakching and Industrial Training Institute (ITI), Kakching. 

Due to the law and order problem in the state, after class X and class XII, many students go outside the state for studies. Kakching is an important town for higher studies in Indian classical music under the Bhatkhande Hindustani Sangeet Mahavidyalaya, the only institution in Eastern India where Indian classical music is taught up to the highest levels (Nipun), attracting hundreds of students every year from Manipur.

Culture and Tourism

Kakching participates in many cultural fields reflecting the heritage of the Meitei people, including storytelling and dance (Nat Sankirtan and Meitei Pung Cholom), as well as the martial arts Thang-Ta, Satjal, Mukna, and the sport of Kangjei. The Kakching Haraoba festival is one of six Lai Haraoba in the state of Manipur. This festival is in part a recollection of the creation stories played by the deities with the first origin of this universe and evolution of plants and animals through the will of Atiya Shidaba.

The People's Museum in Kakching houses many ethnic and valuable items. Additionally, the municipality has three cinema halls that provide daily shows.

The dialect of Meitei language spoken in Kakching is slightly different from the main Meitei language in terms of tone and style.

Markets, including those run by the local company ADAM Kakching, where wood products and gift-items are sold, have attracted people from outside the town.

Another popular attraction in the town is Uyok Ching - Kakching Garden.

Aerodrome
During the Second World War and as part of campaigns against the Indian National Army and its allies, the British Government in India constructed an aerodrome in Kakching which provided the British Army with vital arms, ammunition and food. Today the site is occupied mostly by the Assam Rifles and partially converted into paddy fields by local farmers. There are still hangar sites in and around the small hills surrounding the aerodrome. Farmers have been known to find shells while tilling the land.

Indian national hero, Subhas Chandra Bose, took his last flight from the aerodrome after the war before his controversial death.

Kakching Garden 

The Kakching Garden is situated at Uyok Ching, to the south of Kakching Market, and has been developed as a tourist centre. The site includes different religious destinations including the "Ibudhou Pakhangba Laishang" (also termed as "Ibudhou Pakhangba Laisang"), the shrine of goddess Haoreima Sampubi, a shrine of Shiva, a rose garden, parks and restaurants. A road up to the hill was constructed for vehicles to reach the garden.
The site is popular with people from Manipur and the surrounding area. Important programmes relating to social and culture are also organised here.

Pakhangba Temple 
The Pakhangba Temple of the Kakching Garden is built in traditional Meitei architecture. It has a serpentine dragon statue of God Pakhangba being installed inside the temple hall. Visitors offer fruits and flowers to deity to seek his blessings. The shrine is located inside but just next to the entrance gate of the Kakching Garden.

Statue of Haoreima Sampubi

Politics
Kakching is part of Outer Manipur (Lok Sabha constituency). It sends one MLA in the state assembly. Shri Mayanglambam Rameshwor Singh represents Kakching following the 11th assembly election.

Health Care Services
Kakching has a government run Community Health Centre at the foothill of Kakching Mahadeva, near Good Shepherd School. It was previously a fully-fledged hospital known as Kakching Rural Hospital. There are additionally many private clinics.

Jivan Hospital is a newly opened hospital run by two retired para-medical officers, Dr. Yengkhom Ashok Kumar and his wife Dr. Y. Jivanlata, a retired District Medical Superintendent. It is situated near the Assam Rifle camp. The hospital provides medical services to villages in Chandel, Thoubal and some parts of Churachandpur district. It is the only service available in these areas, apart from those at Imphal. Jivan Hospital meets emergency needs, particularly to Accident and Emergency patients.

ANANDASING YOGA & NATURE CURE RESEARCH HOSPITAL
Run by dr.M.Rajkumar Singh 
Serving the suffering humanity through Yoga & Naturopathy since, 1983
Anandasing Yoga & Nature Cure Research Hospital is situated at the outskirt of Kakching Municipality at the foothills Machin Manao Hills, Chumnang, serving the suffering humanity through Yoga & Naturopathy since, 1983.

Kakching Consumers Forum
Kakching Consumers Forum is a non-profit, voluntary initiative of social workers and public leaders to serve the interests of LPG, electricity and water consumers, and to address their grievances. It was established on 1 January 2015 in a meeting convened at the residence of Y. Rajendro Singh, Councilor of Kakching Municipal Council Ward No. 9.

Transportation
Kakching is connected by road to Thoubal and Moreh via AH1. It is also connected with the Chandel district headquarters by an Inter-District Road. The Indo-Burma Sugnu Road State Highway connects Kakching with Sugnu in the south and Mayang-Imphal in the north.

References

External links
Kakching Municipal Council
Kakching Thinks
The Kakching Times
A Public Portal of Kakching
Kakching Educational Trust
Pictures from Kakching
Pictures from Kakching
Festivals at Kakching

Cities and towns in Kakching district
Thoubal